Hadfield railway station serves the Peak District town of Hadfield in Derbyshire, England. The station is one of the twin termini at the Derbyshire end of the Manchester-Glossop Line, the other being Glossop. It was opened by the Sheffield, Ashton-under-Lyne and Manchester Railway in 1844.

The line formerly continued east of Hadfield to Penistone and Sheffield via the Woodhead Tunnel. Passenger trains on the Woodhead Line were withdrawn east of Hadfield on 5 January 1970, followed by complete closure in 1981. The tracks were lifted several years later, but the trackbed is still visible and has been partly adapted as a footpath.  Since the end of through passenger services to Penistone and Sheffield, only the former eastbound platform has been used and the section westwards to the junction at Dinting is now single track.

Hadfield is the eastern terminus for local trains to/from Manchester Piccadilly. From 1954 until 1984 the station was served by Class 506 electric multiple units (EMUs), latterly the only British Rail EMUs capable of operating on the Woodhead Line's non-standard 1,500 V DC electric system. In December 1984 the line was converted to the standard 25,000 V AC system and the Class 506s were withdrawn and replaced by Class 303 EMUs. 

The Class 303 EMUs were replaced by Class 305 EMUs in the mid-1990s, the Class 305 EMUs were replaced by Class 323 EMUs in 1997. 

Trains at Hadfield are now mostly formed of Class 323 EMUs, sometimes Class 331 EMUs are used.

History
The Sheffield, Ashton-under-Lyne and Manchester Railway was authorised in May 1837, and the line was opened in stages. Initially, there were five trains per day (weekdays and Sundays) in each direction over this stretch, running between Manchester Store Street and Woodhead, except for one eastbound train which on weekdays commenced its journey at Newton. The trains called at all stations, of which Hadfield was the only intermediate station also opened on 7 August 1844; some timetables have shown it as Hadfield for Hollingsworth.

The line between Manchester and Sheffield Victoria was electrified in the early 1950s, including some of the branches; the full electric service between Manchester and  began on 14 June 1954, and this included the local service between Manchester,  and Hadfield. For the local services, eight three-car electric multiple-units (later known as ) were provided; these had been built in 1950 but stored until required in 1954. Passenger services east of Hadfield ceased in January 1970, and the line between Hadfield and Penistone was closed completely in July 1981.

Accidents and incidents
On 8 April 1981, a freight train derailed at the station.

Facilities
The station is staffed six days per week, with the ticket office open from start of service until mid-evening (06:00-19:10 weekdays, 06:30-19:40 Saturdays, closed Sundays).  A self-service ticket machine is provided for use when the ticket office is closed or for collecting pre-paid tickets.  The remainder of the station building is in private commercial use as a public house; part of the frontage onto the platform serves as a covered waiting area for passengers.  Train running details are offered via digital information screens, automated announcements and timetable posters.  Step-free access is available between the station entrance and platform.

Service
There is generally a half-hourly service Monday to Saturday daytimes via Glossop to Manchester Piccadilly.
Some peak journeys operate to or from Manchester directly via Dinting missing out the reverse at Glossop, allowing a 20-minute frequency from the same number of trains.

The Sunday service is half hourly, though evening services are roughly hourly seven days a week.

Notes

References

External links

A drawing of the signal box diagram of Hadfield, by "D Raftsman" from signalbox.org

Railway stations in Derbyshire
DfT Category E stations
Former Great Central Railway stations
Railway stations in Great Britain opened in 1844
Northern franchise railway stations